Up-Tight (shown as Up-Tight Everything's Alright on the cover) is a 1966 album by American singer Stevie Wonder, released by Motown on the Tamla label. It was his fifth studio release.

Production
Up-Tight was recorded at Motown's studio Hitsville U.S.A. in Detroit. It includes two earlier recordings, the 1962 single "Contract on Love" and the un-issued 1964 single "Pretty Little Angel".

Also included on the album are "Nothing's Too Good for My Baby", another Wonder co-write, and a cover of folk star Bob Dylan's "Blowin' in the Wind", which made Wonder popular with crossover audiences, and a cover of the standard, Teach Me Tonight, featuring vocals by The Four Tops.

Stevie was backed by the Funk Brothers, the legendary, but uncredited, early period Motown Records studio musicians, creators of the famous, recognisable '60s Motown sound. Motown's in-house female backing group, The Andantes, also accompany Wonder on the album. Backing vocalist Pat Lewis stepped in (as a replacement for one of the singers who couldn't make it to one of the recording sessions) and recorded with the group.

"Pretty Little Angel" was listed as a single release in 1964. The track was mastered for single release in the fall of 1964 but not issued at that time.  However, some copies were pressed two years later when the track was reconsidered for single release. These copies, of which there are very few, were pressed with the later style Tamla label (i.e. the post globes label) that was introduced in the US during the second half of 1966. The recording was again withdrawn when "A Place In The Sun" was considered superior.

Release 
The album was released on May 4, 1966 on Motown Records' Tamla label. The album features the U.S. Top 5 single "Uptight (Everything's Alright)", which Wonder co-wrote with Sylvia Moy and Henry Cosby.

Commercial performance
The album reached No. 33 on the Billboard Pop Albums chart and No. 2 on the R&B Albums chart.

Track listing

Side one
"Love a Go Go" (Beth Beatty, Ernie Shelby) – 2:42
"Hold Me" (Morris Broadnax, Clarence Paul, Wonder) – 2:35
"Blowin' in the Wind" (Bob Dylan) – 3:45
"Nothing's Too Good for My Baby" (Henry Cosby, Sylvia Moy, William Stevenson) – 2:38
"Teach Me Tonight" (Sammy Cahn, Gene De Paul) – 2:38
"Uptight (Everything's Alright)" (Wonder as Stevie Judkins, Moy, Cosby) – 2:53

Side two
"Ain't That Asking for Trouble" (Moy, Paul, Wonder) – 2:47
"I Want My Baby Back" (Harvey Fuqua, Cornelius Grant, Eddie Kendricks, Norman Whitfield) – 2:46
"Pretty Little Angel" (Paul, Mike Valvano, Wonder) – 2:11
"Music Talk" (Ted Hull, Paul, Wonder) – 2:52
"Contract on Love" (Janie Bradford, Lamont Dozier, Brian Holland) – 2:02
"With a Child's Heart" (Vicki Basemore, Cosby, Moy) – 3:03

Personnel 
 Stevie Wonder – lead vocals; harmony vocals (side 1, tracks 1 and 2; side 2, track 3); harmonica; keyboards; percussion
 Clarence Paul – co-lead vocals (on "Blowin' in the Wind")
 Levi Stubbs – co-lead vocals (on "Teach Me Tonight")
 Abdul "Duke" Fakir, Lawrence Payton, and Renaldo "Obie" Benson – backing vocals (on "Teach Me Tonight")
 The Andantes – backing vocals (side 1, tracks 2, 4, and 6; side 2, tracks 1, 2, and 4)
 Pat Lewis – backing vocals (with The Andantes; unknown tracks)
 The Originals – backing vocals (on "Nothing's Too Good For My Baby")
 The Temptations – backing vocals (on "Contract on Love")
 The Funk Brothers – instrumentation
 Detroit Symphony Orchestra – instrumentation (on "Pretty Little Angel" and "With a Child's Heart")

Charts

References 

1966 albums
Stevie Wonder albums
Albums recorded at Hitsville U.S.A.
Albums produced by Henry Cosby
Albums produced by Clarence Paul
Albums produced by William "Mickey" Stevenson
Albums produced by Brian Holland
Albums produced by Lamont Dozier
Tamla Records albums